Immo Stabreit (born 24 January 1933 Rathenow, Province of Brandenburg, Germany) is a German diplomat, and was West German and German Ambassador to South Africa from 1987 to 1992, Ambassador to the United States from 1992 to 1995 and Ambassador to France from 1995 to 1998. He is a Member of the Advisory Board of the Global Panel Foundation, a respected NGO that works behind the scenes in crisis areas around the world.

Life
He grew up in Berlin. He graduated from Princeton University, with a bachelor's degree (BA) in 1953, and studied law Free University of Berlin and Ruprecht Karls University of Heidelberg, with a Ph.D. in 1963.

From 1964 to 1966, he was First Secretary at the Foreign Office in Bonn. 
He was First Secretary Department of the Soviet Union from 1966 to 1973. 
He served as Deputy Head of the Soviet Union office in Bonn, from 1974 to 1975. He studied at the Advanced Study Program at Harvard University. 
He served in the International Energy Agency in Paris, until 1978.

In 1983, he became Head of Department for Foreign Affairs
He was ambassador to South Africa, from 1987 to 1992.
He was ambassador in Paris, from 1995 to 1998.
He retired in 2002.

Works
Die Revision multilateraler völkerrechtlicher Verträge durch eine begrenzte Anzahl der Vertragsparteien, 223 S. 1964.
"Die EPZ als Faktor der internationalen Politik. Entstehung, Funktionsweise, Perspektive", in: Elemente des Wandels in der westlichen Welt, Hrsg. Coulmas, P. 1979, S. 287-298.
"Die Ergebnisse der KIWZ im Energiebereich", (Konferenz über internationale wirtschaftliche Zusammenarbeit, KIWZ)
with Benno Zündorf: Die Ostverträge. Die Verträge von Moskau, Warschau, Prag, das Berlin-Abkommen und die Verträge mit der DDR, München 1979.
"Yugoslav Breakup: Don't Blame Germany", The Washington Post 29. June 1993

References

External links

http://www.c-spanvideo.org/immostabreit

1933 births
Living people
People from Rathenow
People from the Province of Brandenburg
Ambassadors of Germany to the United States
Ambassadors of Germany to France
Ambassadors of Germany to South Africa